Lefua is a genus of stone loaches native to East Asia.this genus have Barbels at their mouths (usually three pairs) and their nostrils (usually one pair). Some other traits typically found in this family are their bodies are round column, swimming well.

Species
There are currently eight recognized species in this genus:

 Lefua costata (Kessler, 1876) (Eightbarbel loach)(Continental eight barbeled loach)
 Lefua echigonia D. S. Jordan & R. E. Richardson, 1907(Japanese eight barbeled loach)
 Lefua hoffmanni Herre, 1932
 Lefua nikkonis (D. S. Jordan & Fowler, 1903)(ainu eight barbeled loach)
 Lefua pleskei (Herzenstein, 1888)
 Lefua sayu (Herre & S. Y. Lin, 1936)
 lefua torrentis (Hosoya,Ito & Miyazaki, 2018)(stream eight barbeled loach)
 lefua tokaiensis (Hosoya,Ito & Miyazaki, 2019)(tokai stream eight barbeled loach)

References

Nemacheilidae
Taxa named by Solomon Herzenstein